William Bailie (died ) was a native of Ayrshire, Scotland. He built Bailieborough Castle close to what was to become the town of Bailieborough and settled a number of Scottish families in the area. He is credited as the founder of the town of Bailieborough, although the present town did not develop until the 19th century when Colonel William Young of Loughgall, County Armagh owned the estate.

Family 
William had two sons William and Robert. His eldest son, William Bailie, became Bishop of Clonfert and Kilmacduagh and inherited his father's estate, which passed through his only daughter Jane into the Hamilton family.

References

Year of birth unknown
1648 deaths
People from County Cavan
People from Ayrshire
Scottish emigrants to Ireland
17th-century Scottish people
17th-century Irish people